The Ulster Intermediate Club Football Championship is an annual Gaelic football tournament played between the hundreds of intermediate football clubs in Ulster. There are nine county championships between the nine counties of Ulster. The nine winners go on to play each other in the Ulster Club Championship in a knock-out format. The winners go on to compete with the Connacht, Leinster, Munster and London champions in the All-Ireland Intermediate Club Football Championship. The prize for the winners is the McCully Cup, named in honour of Clontibret O'Neills stalwart Packie McCully.

Roll of honour

Wins listed by county

No club from Armagh has ever won the Ulster Intermediate Club Football Championship.

See also
Munster Intermediate Club Football Championship
Leinster Intermediate Club Football Championship
Connacht Intermediate Club Football Championship

References

2